The Mid North Coast is a country region in the north-east of the state of New South Wales, Australia.

Heading northwards beyond Newcastle, the Mid North Coast region's main towns include the towns of Bulahdelah, Forster, Tuncurry, Wingham, Taree, Port Macquarie, Kempsey, South West Rocks, Macksville, Nambucca Heads, Bellingen and Coffs Harbour. Of these Taree, Port Macquarie and Coffs Harbour are the major commercial centres, all with large shopping centres, public facilities and attractions. Kempsey and Forster-Tuncurry are considered semi-major commercial centres. Smaller towns that are popular tourist spots are North Haven, South West Rocks, Urunga, Gloucester and Pacific Palms.

The region has a subtropical climate and is known for its waterways, beaches and hinterland of forests and farms. Major industries are farming, logging and tourism.

Demography and area

The following local government areas are contained within the region:

Public transport

Bus
Many bus services run throughout the region. Providers include Buslines, Busways, Eggins, Ryans and Sawtell Coaches.

Rail 

There are several railway stations on the Mid North Coast serviced by three trains; the Grafton, the Casino and the Brisbane XPT trains. Each run north and south once a day. Heading north from Sydney Central, the first station on the mid north coast is Gloucester followed by Wingham and Taree. Further north are Kendall, Wauchope (for Port Macquarie), Kempsey, Macksville, Urunga, Sawtell and Coffs Harbour. There is no station for Forster-Tuncurry.

See also

 Regions of New South Wales

References

External links
Local Government Directory